Muhammad Ashiq (17 March 1935 – 11 March 2018) was a Pakistani cyclist. He competed at the 1960 Summer Olympics and the 1964 Summer Olympics. He started his career as a boxer. However, after a fight, where he received many injuries, he switched his career to cycling. He worked as a rickshaw driver in Pakistan.

References

External links
 

1935 births
2018 deaths
Pakistani male cyclists
Olympic cyclists of Pakistan
Cyclists at the 1960 Summer Olympics
Cyclists at the 1964 Summer Olympics
Cyclists from Lahore
Asian Games medalists in cycling
Cyclists at the 1958 Asian Games
Medalists at the 1958 Asian Games
Asian Games silver medalists for Pakistan
Deaths from cerebrovascular disease
Neurological disease deaths in Pakistan